Tiesa (English: truth) was the official daily newspaper in the Lithuanian SSR. Established in 1917, the newspaper soon became the official voice of the Communist Party of Lithuania. After the Lithuanian victory in the Lithuanian–Soviet War, the party and the newspaper were outlawed in Lithuania. Therefore, it was first printed in exile and later illegally in Kaunas. Tiesa survived irregular publishing schedules, frequent relocations, staff changes, and other difficulties and, after the Soviet occupation of Lithuania in June 1940, became the official daily of the new communist regime. At its peak, its circulation exceeded 300,000 copies. After the collapse of the Soviet Union, Tiesa lost its official status and its circulation shrunk. The publication was discontinued in 1994.

History

Early history
The first issue of Tiesa was published by the Lithuanian section of the Russian Social Democratic Labour Party (bolsheviks) in Petrograd on April 12, 1917. In October 1917, Tiesa became the official newspaper of the Lithuanian section. From April to December 1918, it was published in Moscow. By December 12, 1918, 91 issues of Tiesa were published.

In March–April 1919, five issues of the newspaper were published in Vilnius, the proclaimed capital of the short-lived Lithuanian–Belorussian Soviet Socialist Republic. It was the official newspaper of the Communist Party (Bolsheviks) of Lithuania and Belorussia. When Poland captured Vilnius during the Vilna offensive, Tiesa evacuated and was printed with interruptions in Raseiniai, Kaunas, Königsberg, Bellshill, Smolensk as the official newspaper of the Communist Party of Lithuania. In March 1926, it settled more permanently in Kaunas, the temporary capital of Lithuania. The communist party was outlawed in Lithuania, therefore Tiesa had to be printed illegally. There were 157 issues published in Kaunas.

Lithuanian SSR
After the Soviet occupation of Lithuania in June 1940, Tiesa was legalized and became a daily. It appeared first as Liaudies balsas (June 16–25) but soon recovered its historical name. It continued to be the official outlet of the Communist Party of Lithuania until the German invasion of the Soviet Union in June 1941. The newspaper was reestablished in Moscow in February 1942. There, 85 issues were published until July 1944. In August 1944, after the Soviet victory in Vilnius Offensive, the newspaper relocated to Vilnius. Once again, it became a daily. From August 1945, in addition to being the official newspaper of the Communist Party of Lithuania, Tiesa was also the official voice of the communist government, specifically the Supreme Soviet of the Lithuanian SSR and the Council of Ministers of the Lithuanian SSR. It had permanent correspondents in Moscow and New York. In 1967, Tiesa received the Order of the Red Banner of Labour.

Independent Lithuania
After the first free parliamentary elections in February 1990, Lithuania declared independence from the Soviet Union. Lietuvos aidas became the official newspaper of the Supreme Council – Reconstituent Seimas. The Communist Party of Lithuania reorganized itself into the Democratic Labour Party of Lithuania (LDDP). Tiesa followed suit and became the newspaper of the LDDP. However, in 1992, Tiesa became a privately owned publication. On July 1, 1994, it was discontinued and replaced by daily Diena (English: day). The last issue of Diena was published in 1996.

Content
Tiesa was dedicated to communist ideology. It advocated socialist revolution and criticized other political parties. It reported on the activities of the Communist Party of Lithuania and its organizations, published their programs and resolutions, statements and manifestos. Tiesa also reported on the biggest world and Lithuanian news, provided their analysis according to the communist point of view. The newspaper also published stories on the life of workers, peasants, soldiers. Occasionally it also published fiction, mostly poems.

Editors
The editors-in-chief were:

References

External links
Digital archive 1917–47

Communist newspapers
Defunct newspapers published in Lithuania
Eastern Bloc mass media
Lithuanian-language newspapers
Publications established in 1917
Publications disestablished in 1994
Daily newspapers published in Lithuania
1994 disestablishments in Lithuania
Communism in Lithuania